Abdoul Razak Issoufou Alfaga (born 26 December 1994) is a Nigerien taekwondo athlete.

When Issoufou was 7, his father forbade him from taking taekwondo after a cousin died from an injury in a fight. After Issoufou moved to an uncle's home in Togo four years later, he eventually got back into the sport by borrowing a friend's dobok. Eventually Issufou managed to get the support from the International Olympic Committee and train outside Africa, moving to the Taekwondo Competence Center in Friedrichshafen, Germany.

A gold medalist at the 2015 African Games, Issoufou later got the silver in the African Olympic Qualifiers, enabling him to represent Niger at the 2016 Summer Olympics in Rio de Janeiro. He was chosen to be the Nigerien flagbearer at the Parade of Nations.

During the taekwondo tournament, Issoufou got to the finals, making him Niger's first medallist since Issake Dabore in the 1972 Summer Olympics. Despite losing the gold to Radik Isayev of Azerbaijan, Issoufou's silver medal was the best result ever by a Nigerien at the Olympic Games. He was the flag bearer for Niger during the closing ceremony.

At the 2021 African Taekwondo Championships held in Dakar, Senegal, he won the gold medal in the men's +87 kg event.

He competed in the men's +80 kg event at the 2020 Summer Olympics.

References

External links
 
 

1994 births
Living people
Nigerien male taekwondo practitioners
Nigerien expatriate sportspeople in Germany
Olympic taekwondo practitioners of Niger
Taekwondo practitioners at the 2016 Summer Olympics
Olympic silver medalists for Niger
Olympic medalists in taekwondo
Medalists at the 2016 Summer Olympics
African Games gold medalists for Niger
African Games medalists in taekwondo
Competitors at the 2015 African Games
Competitors at the 2019 African Games
World Taekwondo Championships medalists
Taekwondo practitioners at the 2020 Summer Olympics
African Taekwondo Championships medalists
21st-century Nigerien people